Tsentral'nyi Stadion is a multi-use stadium in Kara-Suu, Kyrgyzstan.  It is currently used mostly for football matches and serves as the home stadium for Zhashtyk Ak Altyn Kara-Suu of the Kyrgyzstan League.  The stadium holds 6,000 people.

External links
Stadium information

Football venues in Kyrgyzstan
Jalal-Abad Region